WLOL-FM is a Catholic Religious broadcast radio station licensed to Star City, West Virginia and serving the Morgantown/Star City/Westover area.  WLOL-FM is owned and operated by Light of Life Community, Inc.

External links
 Light of Life Ministry Online
 
 
 

LOL-FM